John McGough (20 January 1881 – 23 April 1967) was a Scottish athlete.  He competed at the 1908 Summer Olympics in London. He was born in Armagh City, Ireland. In the 1500 metres, McGough placed third in his initial semifinal heat and did not advance to the final.  His time was 4:16.4.

Biography
Born in Ireland, John McGough moved to Scotland when only six months old and became the leading Scottish middle-distance runner in the early years of the century. Living and working as a postman in the famous Gorbals district of Glasgow, he joined the Bellahouston Harriers and won their 1900 cross-country title. At one time he held every Scottish record from 1000y to 4 miles. He won a total of 12 Scottish AAA titles: 880y (1903–04, 1907); mile (1902–07, 1910), and 4 miles (1902–03). At Ibrox Stadium on 20 June 1903 McGough won the half-mile, mile and 4-miles titles all in the same afternoon. He was also the Irish AAA champion at both 2 and 3 miles in 1905 and at one mile in 1907. He also finished as runner-up at three successive AAA Championships (1904–06). This was undoubtedly his best distance and he won a silver medal in the 1500 at the 1906 Olympic Games. His journey to Athens for the Games was not a pleasant one as he suffered sea-sickness during part of the trip. He also suffered at the 1908 London Olympics when ran in the 1500 metres with a bandaged ankle and missed the final after finishing third in his heat.

Between 1901 and 1911 McGough averaged more than 20 wins per year and it is said that no Scottish runner won more handicap races off scratch than he did. In his younger days McGough helped out Glasgow Celtic FC as a masseur in the winter months and after his retirement from athletics in 1910 was appointed the assistant manager to Bob Davies at Celtic. When Davies took over at Manchester City FC, McGough moved with him, and stayed until the outbreak of the war when he returned to his native Ireland and became a farmer. He also showed a great interest in Gaelic Football back in his home country and in 1915 was a founder member of the Blackhill Emeralds GAA team and, as a trainer, he helped Monaghan Juniors to win the Ulster title in 1939, 1940 and 1945. In 1947 he was one of the trainers of the Cavan team that beat Kerry in the GAA All-Ireland final at the Polo Grounds, New York.

Personal Bests: 800 – 1:57.6 (1906); 1000y – 2:18.2 (1905); 1500 – 4:12.6e (1906); Mile – 4:19.2 (1906); 2 miles – 9:32.4 (1904); 3 miles – 14:44.6 (1904); 4 miles – 20:06.2 (1905).

References

Sources
 
 
 

1881 births
1976 deaths
Scottish male middle-distance runners
Olympic athletes of Great Britain
Athletes (track and field) at the 1908 Summer Olympics
Athletes (track and field) at the 1906 Intercalated Games
Scottish Olympic competitors